The 2018–19 Scottish League Cup (also known as the Betfred Cup for sponsorship reasons) was the 73rd season of Scotland's second-most prestigious football knockout competition.

The format for the 2018–19 competition was the same as the previous two seasons.

It began with eight groups of five teams which included all Scottish Professional Football League (SPFL) clubs, excluding those competing in Champions League and Europa League qualifiers, as well as the top teams from the 2017–18 Highland Football League (Cove Rangers) and the 2017–18 Lowland Football League (Spartans).

Schedule

Format
The competition began with eight groups of five teams. The four clubs competing in the UEFA Champions League (Celtic) and Europa League (Aberdeen, Hibernian and Rangers) qualifying rounds were given a bye through to the second round. The 40 teams competing in the group stage consisted of the other eight teams that competed in the 2017–18 Scottish Premiership, and all of the teams that competed in the 2017–18 Scottish Championship, 2017–18 Scottish League One and 2017–18 Scottish League Two, as well as the 2017–18 Highland Football League and the 2017–18 Lowland Football League champions.

The winners of each of the eight groups, as well as the four best runners-up progressed to the second round (last 16), which included the four UEFA qualifying clubs. At this stage, the competition reverted to the traditional knock-out format. The four group winners with the highest points total and the clubs entering at this stage were seeded, with the four group winners with the lowest points unseeded along with the four best runners-up.

Bonus point system
In December 2015, the SPFL announced that alongside the new group stage format, a bonus point system would be introduced to provide greater excitement and increase the number of meaningful games at this stage. The traditional point system of awarding three points for a win and one point for a draw is used, however, for each group stage match that finishes in a draw, a penalty shoot-out takes place, with the winner being awarded a bonus point.

Group stage

The group stage was made up of eight teams from the 2017–18 Scottish Premiership, and all ten teams from each of the 2017–18 Scottish Championship, 2017–18 Scottish League One and 2017–18 Scottish League Two, as well as the winners of the 2017–18 Highland Football League and 2017–18 Lowland Football League. The 40 teams were divided into two sections – North and South – with each section containing four top seeds, four second seeds and 12 unseeded teams. Each section was drawn into four groups with each group comprising one top seed, one second seed and three unseeded teams.

The draw for the group stages took place on 25 May 2018 and was broadcast live on BT Sport 2.

North

Group A

Group B

Group C

Group D

South

Group E

Group F

Group G

Group H

Best runners-up

Knockout phase

Second round

Draw and seeding
Aberdeen, Celtic, Hibernian and Rangers entered the competition at this stage, after receiving a bye for the group stage due to their participation in UEFA club competitions.

The draw for the second round took place at Tynecastle Park following the conclusion of the Heart of Midlothian-Inverness Caledonian Thistle match on 29 July 2018. The four UEFA-qualifying clubs and the four group winners with the best record were seeded for the draw.

Teams in Bold advanced to the quarter-finals.

Notes
† denotes teams playing in the Championship.

Matches

Quarter-finals

Draw
The draw for the quarter-finals took place on 19 August 2018 following the conclusion of the Kilmarnock-Rangers match. The draw was unseeded.

Teams in Bold advanced to the semi-finals.

Teams

Matches

Semi-finals

Draw
The draw for the semi-finals took place on 26 September 2018 following the conclusion of the final three quarter-final matches. The draw was unseeded.

Teams

Matches

Semi-final controversy
The semi-finals were due to take place at Hampden Park on 27 and 28 October 2018, but due to Celtic and Rangers participating in the 2018–19 UEFA Europa League group stage, the team who would play on the Saturday would have less than 48 hours rest before the match. As a result, the SPFL - who had previously committed to using Hampden as the venue for the League Cup semi-finals and final - consulted with the four clubs involved, competition broadcaster BT Sport and Police Scotland to find a solution which may have included playing one match at Murrayfield Stadium or a change in date.

The SPFL announced on 27 September 2018 that both matches will be played at Hampden Park on the Sunday (28 October), with first match starting at noon and the other being played in the evening. The following day, SPFL chief executive Neil Doncaster said the decision was "the best solution" despite the "regrettable inconvenience" to supporters. The SPFL are contractually obliged to use Hampden Park as the venue for the semi-finals of the League Cup when Rangers or Celtic are involved or an attendance of over 20,000 is expected.

Aberdeen and Heart of Midlothian both criticised the SPFL for the decision saying they were "appalled" and "astonished". Aberdeen released a statement to confirm their "dismay" that their match would kick-off at a "completely unacceptable" time for their supporters. The first train leaving Aberdeen on 28 October 2018 would not arrive in Glasgow until 12:14, 14 minutes after kick-off. Heart of Midlothian manager Craig Levein said that playing both semi-finals at Hampden on the same day is the "craziest thing", "beyond belief" and "madness" and, in a statement released by the club, chairwoman Ann Budge said she had asked the SPFL if they could be released from their contract with Hampden Park Ltd as a result of the "very special circumstances" and was then told a formal request by the SPFL had been unsuccessful.

On 2 October 2018, Police Scotland Assistant Chief Constable Bernard Higgins said that they were "aware of issues and concerns" regarding the semi-final arrangements. As a result, the SPFL are reported to be considering moving the Heart of Midlothian-Celtic semi-final to Murrayfield Stadium pending a meeting with Police Scotland.

On 3 October 2018, the SPFL confirmed that venues and kick-off times had been switched to 13:30 at Murrayfield and 16:30 at Hampden.

Final

Top goalscorers

Media coverage
The domestic broadcasting rights for the competition are held exclusively by BT Sport.

The following matches will be broadcast live on UK television:

References

External links
 

Scottish League Cup seasons
League Cup
2018–19 in Scottish football cups